The thymic branches of internal thoracic artery are arteries that supply the thymus.

External links
 

Arteries of the thorax